Crawford Derek Mollison (22 October 1901 – 19 December 1943) was an Australian rules footballer who played with Melbourne in the Victorian Football League (VFL). He died while serving in the Second AIF when an aircraft in which he was a passenger crashed at Canal Creek, near Yaamba, Queensland.

Family
The son of Crawford Henry Mollison (1863-1949), the Victorian Government Pathologist, and his second wife, Elizabeth Corientia Mollison (1869-1920), née Browne, daughter of Thomas Alexander Browne a.k.a. Rolf Boldrewood, Crawford Derek Mollison was born, in South Yarra, on 22 October 1901.

He married Muriel Wallis Ludbrook on 2 July 1924; they had two children, Barbara (1925-), and Graeme (1929-).

His wife's brother, Campbell Malcolm Ludbrook, died (on 11 February 1922) as a result of the severe head injuries he sustained when an aeroplane in which he was a passenger crashed near Mildura; the pilot, a friend of Ludbrook's, did not have a pilot's license, and the aeroplane had been denied a certificate of airworthiness by the Department of Civil Aviation.

Crawford Derek Mollison died in an aircraft crash in Queensland while serving with the Second AIF on 19 December 1943.

Education
Educated at Melbourne Grammar School, he was an excellent schoolboy cricketer, and footballer.

Football
On leaving school, he played football for Old Melburnians Football Club in the Metropolitan Amateur Football Association.

A Victorian representative, he retired at a young age to pursue a business career.

Military service
He enlisted in the Second AIF, and served in both the Middle East and in New Guinea.

Death
On 19 December 1943, Mollison was one of 31 people on board when a C-47 Dakota aircraft of the 22nd Transport Squadron, 374th Troop Carrier Group crashed at Canal Creek, near Yaamba, Queensland, north of Rockhampton in Central Queensland. The plane, which was flying from Townsville to Brisbane, was carrying 20 US Armed Services personnel, two non-combatants, as well as Mollison and seven other members of the Australian Defence force.

It was the second-worst air disaster in Australian history; there were no survivors.

See also
 List of Victorian Football League players who died in active service

Footnotes

References
 Sharland, W.S., "Shelton, Mollison, and O’Connell are League Players Attracting Attention", The Sporting Globe, (Saturday, 21 June 1924), p.8.
 Southerner, "The Story of Great Public Schools: Melbourne Grammar: Sporting Record of Famous Melburnians", The Referee, (Wednesday, 21 January 1931), p.13.
 Australian Military Forces; Attestation Form for Persons Voluntarily Enlisted in the Militia Forces: Crawford Derek Mollison (336015), National Archives of Australia: note that, on enlistment (24 February 1939), Mollison stated that his date of birth was 22 October 1901.
 World War Two Service Record: Captain Crawford Derek Mollison (VX912), National Archives of Australia: note that, on enlistment (4 November 1939), Mollison stated that his date of birth was 22 November 1904.
 Captain Crawford Derek Mollison (VX912), Photograph in the Collection of the Australian War Memorial.
 Roll of Honour: Captain Crawford Derek Mollison (VX912), Australian War Memorial.
 Victorians in Army Casualty Lists: Australia and The Islands: Killed Accidentally, The Argus, (Friday, 14 January 1944), p.4.

External links

 
 
 Demonwiki: Derek Mollison.
 Boyles Football Photos: Derek Mollison.

1901 births
1943 deaths
Australian rules footballers from Melbourne
Melbourne Football Club players
Australian military personnel killed in World War II
People educated at Melbourne Grammar School
Victims of aviation accidents or incidents in Australia
Accidental deaths in Queensland
Australian Army personnel of World War II
Australian Army officers
Victims of aviation accidents or incidents in 1943
People from South Yarra, Victoria
Military personnel from Melbourne
Australian people of English descent